Quadriga Consort aka Quadriga Early Music Band is an early music ensemble from Austria. Founded in 2001 by harpsichordist Nikolaus Newerkla, the ensemble plays rearranged early British and Irish traditional music performed on period instruments.

Quadriga Consort has collaborated with South African-born jazz and pop singer Elisabeth Kaplan and has appeared at festivals in Austria, Europe and the United States. In 2019 Austrian singer Sophie Eder has taken over the part of the ensemble's voice. 

Their record "On a Cold Winter's Day - Early Christmas Music and Carols from the British Isles" (SONY/Deutsche Harmonia Mundi) has become a classical music bestseller album.

Sophie Eder (voice)
Angelika Huemer (recorders, treble viol)
Karin Silldorff (recorders)
Dominika Teufel (tenor viol)
Philipp Comploi (baroque cello/basse de violon) 
Tobias Steinberger / Laurenz Schiffermüller (percussion)
Nikolaus Newerkla (harpsichord, vibrandoneon, voice, arrangements, composition, direction)

Former members
Elisabeth Kaplan (voice)
Peter Trefflinger (baroque cello)
Elisabeth Kurz (treble viol) (†2005)

Discography
2003 Ground, HARP, Berlin
2005 As I Walked Forth: Songs & Tunes of the Isles, ORF, Vienna
2007 By Yon Bonnie Banks: Traditional Early Music of Scotland, ORF, Vienna - 5 stars, Goldberg Magazine, June 2007
2009 Quadriga Live: DVD, make, Vienna
2009 Songs from the British Isles, Live, GRAMOLA, Vienna
2011 Ships Ahoy!: Songs of Wind, Water and Tide, Alpha, Paris - "Pasticcio" award, radio ORF 1
2012/13 On a Cold Winter's Day: Early Christmas Music and Carols from the British Isles, Carpe Diem Records, Bremen (First Edition), later SONY/Deutsche Harmonia Mundi
2014 14 Tales of Mystery, SONY/Deutsche Harmonia Mundi
2015 Winter's Delights, SONY/Deutsche Harmonia Mundi
2021 Midsummer: Songs and Tunes from Scandinavia and the British Isles, SONY/Deutsche Harmonia Mundi

Sheet Music
Nikolaus Newerkla: Playford Dances & Carolan Tunes, Moeck, Celle, Germany, 2007
Nikolaus Newerkla: Scarborough Fair, Moeck, Celle, Germany, 2008
Nikolaus Newerkla: Ancient Tunes in New Consorts, Moeck, Celle, Germany, 2008
Nikolaus Newerkla: Turlough O'Carolan - The Music of an Irish Harper, Bärenreiter, Kassel, Germany, 2012
Nikolaus Newerkla: The English Dancing Master, Bärenreiter, Kassel, Germany, 2012

References

External links
 Quadriga Consort homepage
 Quadriga Consort "The Undaunted Female" official video
 Quadriga Consort "14 Tales of Mystery" (Album Trailer)
 Quadriga Consort " Winter's Delights" (Album Trailer)

Early music consorts
Musical groups established in 2001
2001 establishments in Austria